Brian Patchett (born 1941) was a British corporal of the Intelligence Corps who defected to East Germany in July 1963.

Patchett was an intercept operator at RAF Gatow in West Berlin, and as a consequence he had a comprehensive knowledge of the deployment of British signals units in West Germany. Patchett took part in propaganda broadcasts following his defection, in which he condemned British espionage.

References

1941 births
Living people
British defectors to East Germany
Intelligence Corps officers